Periploca laeta is a moth in the family Cosmopterigidae. It was described by Ronald W. Hodges in 1962. It is found in North America, where it has been recorded from Florida, Arizona,
Illinois, Ohio, Quebec and West Virginia.

Adults have been recorded on wing in February and from May to July.

The larvae feed on Juniperus species.

References

Moths described in 1962
Chrysopeleiinae
Taxa named by Ronald W. Hodges
Moths of North America